Pierce William Johnson (born May 10, 1991) is an American professional baseball pitcher for the Colorado Rockies of Major League Baseball (MLB). He has previously played in MLB for the Chicago Cubs, San Francisco Giants and San Diego Padres and for the Hanshin Tigers of Nippon Professional Baseball (NPB). He was drafted by the Cubs in the first round of the 2012 Major League Baseball draft out of Missouri State University.

Amateur career
Johnson was drafted by the Tampa Bay Rays in the 15th round of the 2009 Major League Baseball Draft out of Faith Christian Academy in Arvada, Colorado after playing three seasons of varsity baseball.  He did not sign and attended Missouri State University. He finished his first year at Missouri State with a 6–5 record to go along with a 4.76 ERA in 75.2 IP. In 2010 and 2011, he played collegiate summer baseball with the Harwich Mariners of the Cape Cod Baseball League.

Professional career

Chicago Cubs
Johnson was drafted by the Chicago Cubs in the first round of the 2012 Major League Baseball Draft.

In 2013, he went 11–6 with a 2.74 earned run average and 124 strikeouts in 118 innings pitched. Prior to the 2014 season, he was ranked by Baseball America as the 87th best prospect in baseball. The Cubs added him to their 40-man roster after the 2015 season. Johnson spent 2014 with both the Kane County Cougars and the Tennessee Smokies where he posted a 5–5 record with a 2.54 ERA. Johnson stayed with the Smokies during the 2015 season, where he posted a 6–2 record with a 2.08 ERA, holding batters to a .223 batting average. After his success in Tennessee, Johnson was promoted to the Triple-A Iowa Cubs, where he posted a 4–6 record with a 6.14 ERA.

San Francisco Giants
On September 20, 2017, Johnson was claimed off waivers by the San Francisco Giants. He elected free agency on November 3, 2018.

Hanshin Tigers
On December 8, 2018, Johnson signed with the Hanshin Tigers of Nippon Professional Baseball (NPB). 
On December 2, 2019, he become free agent.

San Diego Padres
On December 23, 2019, Johnson signed a two-year contract which includes a third-year club option with the San Diego Padres of Major League Baseball (MLB). In his first season with San Diego, Johnson recorded a 3-1 record and 2.70 ERA with 27 strikeouts in 20.0 innings. Johnson made 63 appearances for the Padres, logging a 3-4 record and 3.22 ERA with 77 strikeouts in 58.2 innings pitched.

On May 9, 2022, Johnson was placed on the 60-day injured list with right elbow tendinitis.

Colorado Rockies
On December 13, 2022, Johnson signed a one-year contract with the Colorado Rockies.

References

External links

Missouri State Bears bio
Prospect Watch: Pierce Johnson making Cubs take notice

1991 births
Living people
American expatriate baseball players in Japan
Arizona League Cubs players
Baseball players from Colorado
Boise Hawks players
Chicago Cubs players
Daytona Cubs players
Hanshin Tigers players
Harwich Mariners players
Iowa Cubs players
Kane County Cougars players
Major League Baseball pitchers
Mesa Solar Sox players
Missouri State Bears baseball players
Nippon Professional Baseball pitchers
People from Arvada, Colorado
Sacramento River Cats players
San Diego Padres players
San Francisco Giants players
Tennessee Smokies players